Hannah Gold is a British children's author.

Gold worked in film and magazines prior to becoming a full-time writer.

The Last Bear won the 2022 Waterstones Children's Book Prize. The Times called it "a stunning debut of a writer to watch".

Publications
The Last Bear, HarperCollins, 2021, illustrated by Levi Pinfold
The Lost Whale, HarperCollins, 2022, illustrated by Levi Pinfold
Finding Bear, 2023, HarperCollins, illustrated by Levi Pinfold

References

Living people
21st-century British novelists
British children's writers
Year of birth missing (living people)